Onipenta is a small village in Mydukur mandal, Kadapa District, Andhra Pradesh, India. This village is famous for brass work handicrafts, handmade brass works and domestic brass products. This village is located on National Highway N.H-16 between Tirupati and Vijayawada.

External links
Onipenta on Wikimapia.
Satellite Map of Onipenta.
.
Another News Article in The Hindu, Regarding a meeting in Onipenta.

References

Villages in Kadapa district